Blairsville or Blairville may refer to:

In the United States
 Blairsville, Georgia
 Blairsville, Indiana
 Blairville, Michigan
 Blairville, New York
 Blairsville, Ohio
 Blairsville, Pennsylvania
 Blairsville, South Carolina

Elsewhere
 Blairville, Pas-de-Calais, a commune in France